Dr. Bhau Daji Lad Museum is the oldest museum in Mumbai. Situated in the vicinity of Byculla Zoo, Byculla East, it was originally established in 1855 as a treasure house of the decorative and industrial arts, and was later renamed in honour of Dr. Bhau Daji Lad.

History

Lord Elphinstone established the Central Museum of Natural History, Economy, Geology, Industry and Arts, the first museum in Bombay in 1855; George Buist took the major initiative for its inception. In 1857, it was closed to the public and its collection was shifted to the Town Hall. In 1858, George Birdwood was appointed curator of the museum. Soon, a committee was formed, comprising him, Bhau Daji Lad and Jaganath Shunkerseth to raise money for construction of a new building for the museum. The foundation of the new building was laid in 1862. It was built with the patronage of many wealthy Indian businessmen and philanthropists like David Sassoon, Sir Jamsetjee Jejeebhoy and Jaganath Shunkerseth.

The construction of the present building in Jijamata Udyan in Byculla started in 1862 and was completed in 1871. The museum was opened on 2 May 1872 as The Victoria and Albert Museum, Bombay. A little more than a hundred years later, on 1 November 1975, the museum was renamed the Dr. Bhau Daji Lad Museum in honour of the man whose vision and dedication enabled its establishment. Dr. Bhau Daji Lad was the first Indian Sheriff of Mumbai, a philanthropist, historian, physician, surgeon and secretary of the Museum Committee when it was first instituted.

The Great Exhibition of 1851 
The idea of setting up a museum in Mumbai was first mooted in 1850 when preparations were being made for the first ‘Great Exhibition of the Works of Industry of all Nations’ to be held in London's Crystal Palace in 1851. Prince Albert, the consort of Queen Victoria, wanted to present to the world the industrial arts and crafts of Britain's colonies and thereby stimulate trade for these products. The Great Exhibition was a catalyst for other world fairs and resulted in the establishment of new museums across the British Empire. The duplicates of art objects and raw products that were sent from the Bombay Presidency to the 1855 Paris Universal Exhibition thus formed the nucleus of a new museum that was set up at the Town Barracks in Fort and known as the ‘Government Central Museum’.

Restoration and revitalisation 
In 2003, the Indian National Trust for Art and Cultural Heritage (INTACH) in collaboration with the Jamnalal Bajaj Foundation and the Municipal Corporation of Greater Mumbai  undertook extensive refurbishment of the building.

After five years of painstaking and intensive work, the museum reopened to the Public on 4 January 2008.

Awards and recognition 

In 2005, the museum won UNESCO's Asia-Pacific Award of Excellence in Cultural Conservation after being restored by conservation architect Vikas Dilawari.

In 2016, the museum received the International Quality Crown award in the gold category for its focus on quality, continuous innovation, and customer satisfaction.

Governance
The museum is managed by a public-private partnership, a first for a cultural institution in India. The partnership involves the Municipal Corporation of Greater Mumbai, the Jamnalal Bajaj Foundation and the Indian National Trust for Art and Cultural Heritage (INTACH).

Tasneem Zakaria Mehta is the honorary director of the museum and has a Board of Management and Trustees that include the mayor and the municipal commissioner of Mumbai.

Collections

This museum houses a large number of archaeological finds, maps and historical photographs of Mumbai, clay models, silver and copper ware and costumes. Its significant collections include a 17th-century manuscript of Hatim Tai. It also houses the iconic Kala Ghoda statue. Outside the museum is the installation of the monolithic basalt elephant sculpture recovered from the sea, which originated from Elephanta Island (Gharapuri Island).

Gallery

References

External links

 Museum site
 Dr.  Bhau Daji Lad Mumbai City Museum at Google Cultural Institute

Culture of Mumbai
Museums in Mumbai
Museums established in 1855
Infrastructure completed in 1871
Local museums in India
Decorative arts museums in India
1855 establishments in India